First Christian Church (First Christian Community Church) is a historic church at 200 S. Walnut Street in Trinidad, Colorado.

It was built in 1922 and was added to the National Register in 1995.

It was designed by architects Isaac Rapp and Arthur C. Hendrickson.

According to its NRHP nomination, "The building is an interesting interpretation of the Mediterranean style by the prominent architectural firm of Rapp, Rapp & Hendrickson. It is one of the last buildings designed by the firm and illustrates the firm's breadth of architectural styles."

References

Churches in Colorado
Churches on the National Register of Historic Places in Colorado
Mission Revival architecture in Colorado
Churches completed in 1922
Churches in Las Animas County, Colorado
National Register of Historic Places in Las Animas County, Colorado